Edgewood School may refer to:

  Edgewood Elementary School; Pine Bluff, Arkansas
  Edgewood Elementary School; Prince George, British Columbia.
  Edgewood Elementary School; Edgewood, British Columbia.
  Edgewood Elementary School; Brooklyn Park, Minnesota.
  Edgewood Elementary School; Edgewood, Maryland
  Edgewood Magnet School; New Haven, Connecticut
 Edgewood Primary School; Hucknall, England